General elections were held in Azad Kashmir on 25 July 2021 after the expiry of the 5-year term of the previous Legislative Assembly. The 2021 General Elections of Azad Jammu and Kashmir held on 25 July, the region's election commission announced on Thursday. The elections were held in 33 constituencies of Azad Kashmir and 12 constituencies of the refugees of Jammu and Kashmir.

By an early estimate, over 2.82 million people of Azad Kashmir were registered to vote; of which 1.59 million were male voters, while 1.297 million were female voters.

A total of 724 people stood for 45 general seats this year. 579 candidates are competing for 33 constituencies within Azad Jammu and Kashmir. The remaining 145 competed for 12 refugee constituencies comprising four provinces of Pakistan.

Background 
In current elections The PTI won 26, the PPP 11 and PML N 6. In addition, AJ&K MC won 1 seats, JK PPP 1 seat.

Following these results, Pakistan Tehreek e Insaf  abled to form a comfortable majority government, controlling 26 general seats and 6 reserved/technocrat seats, giving them 32 out of the 53 seats in the assembly.

Addition of new seats 
4 new seats were added in Azad Kashmir Legislative Assembly. Muzaffarabad, Neelum, Sudhanoti/Poonch and Kotli districts gained an additional seats each, hence, the number of members in the Assembly of Azad Kashmir was elevated from 49 to 53. Therefore the new amount of seats needed for a majority became 27.

Results 
The polls were open across Azad Kashmir and Pakistan from 8am to 5pm PST. The results of AJK election 2021 were started to come after poll closings in the evening. The below table shows election results by political party.

See also
Azad Jammu & Kashmir Election Commission

References 

Azad
Azad